Multiple accounts may refer to:
 Alternate character (also known as an alt), an additional character in addition to a primary player character
 Multi-boxing, playing multiple characters at the same time
 Multi-user, a system that allows more than one user of a computer
 Time-sharing, a system that allows more than one user to access it at the same time
 Sockpuppet (Internet), an online identity used for purposes of deception